Yakubu Yakson Sanda (born 1965) is a Nigerian politician from Bicizà who was elected speaker of the 9th Plateau State House of Assembly in 2021.

Sanda is a first-time member of the Assembly elected from Pengana Constituency on the platform of All Progressives Congress in 2019. 
He was elected by members of the house as speaker after the impeachment of Rt. Hon. Abok Ayuba.

Education 
Yakubu Yackson Sanda attended and obtained his First Leaving School Certificate at UNA Primary School in Jos, after which he completed his Secondary School education at Metropolitan College, Jos. 

He studied Economics at the University of Jos in Plateau State. After which, he worked with the Plateau State Sports Council as an Accountant.

Career  
As an administrator and Accountant by Profession, Yakubu Sanda, rose through the ranks to become a Director of Finance and Supply in the Plateau State Civil Service in the Plateau State Ministry of Sport. 

He previously worked at the 
Plateau State Sports Council, an Accountant at  Plateau HighLand Football Club, and the Team Manager of Plateau United FC.

Politics 
He started his political journey as a young man over 20 years ago, when he was  elected to lead the Buji Youth Development Association as its National President.

After which he contested in the 2003, 2007, 2011 Plateau State House of Assembly elections to represent Pengana constituency, which he lost.  

He was finally elected to the House of Assembly in the 2019 election, and was elected as Speaker after the former Speaker was impeached.

Personal life 
Yakubu Yakson Sanda is a Christian. He is married to Nancy Yakubu Sanda and the union is blessed with three children.

References

1965 births

Living people
People from Plateau State
Nigerian politicians
pol